Reuben Halloran (born in 2002) is an Irish hurler. At college level he plays for Setu Waterford, at club level he plays with De La Salle and at inter-county level with the Waterford senior hurling team. He usually lines out as a forward.

Career

Halloran first played hurling at juvenile and underage levels with the De La Salle club, while also playing as a schoolboy with the De La Salle College in the Harty Cup. He scored all 1-14 of De La Salle's tally when they beat Ballygunner to claim the Waterford U20AHC title. Halloran has also lined out with SETU Waterford in the Fitzgibbon Cup.

Halloran first appeared on the inter-county scene as a member of the Waterford minor hurling team in 2019. He immediately progressed to the under-20 team, however, he missed out on his third and final season with the team in 2022 due to a hamstring injury.

Halloran first played for the senior team during the 2023 Munster Senior Hurling League.

Career statistics

Honours

De La Salle
Waterford Under-21 A Hurling Championship: 2022

References

2002 births
Living people
De La Salle hurlers
Waterford inter-county hurlers